Mount Larsen is a mountain,  high, situated in the east-central portion of Thule Island in the South Sandwich Islands. It was charted in 1930 by Discovery Investigations personnel on the Discovery II who named it for Captain C.A. Larsen.

References

Mountains and hills of South Georgia and the South Sandwich Islands